Pirtleville is a census-designated place (CDP) in Cochise County, Arizona, United States. The population was 1,744 at the 2010 census.

Geography
Pirtleville is located at  (31.358925, -109.566036).

Demographics

As of the census of 2000, there were 1,550 people, 454 households, and 361 families living in the CDP. The racial makeup of the CDP was 53.2% White, 0.7% Black or African American, 1.3% Native American, 0.5% Asian, 0.3% Pacific Islander, 41.4% from other races, and 2.7% from two or more races.  95.0% of the population were Hispanic or Latino of any race.

There were 454 households, out of which 43.2% had children under the age of 18 living with them, 57.7% were married couples living together, 15.9% had a female householder with no husband present, and 20.3% were non-families. 18.7% of all households were made up of individuals, and 8.6% had someone living alone who was 65 years of age or older.  The average household size was 3.41 and the average family size was 3.91.

In the CDP, the age distribution of the population shows 36.0% under the age of 18, 9.1% from 18 to 24, 24.0% from 25 to 44, 20.6% from 45 to 64, and 10.3% who were 65 years of age or older.  The median age was 29 years. For every 100 females, there were 99.2 males.  For every 100 females age 18 and over, there were 93.4 males.

The median income for a household in the CDP was $19,355, and the median income for a family was $21,301. Males had a median income of $23,359 versus $20,852 for females. The per capita income for the CDP was $7,244.  About 30.1% of families and 38.3% of the population were below the poverty line, including 49.8% of those under age 18 and 38.4% of those age 65 or over.

Notable person

 Raul Castro, governor of Arizona and diplomat

References

Census-designated places in Cochise County, Arizona